Goumont or variation may refer to:

 Hougoumont, formerly named "Goumont" (also 'Gomont'), a fortified farming estate involved in the Battle of Waterloo
 Marly Goumont (now Marly-Gomont), Aisne, Hauts-de-France, France; a commune that contained the medieval village of Marly and medieval hamlet of Goumont
 Chemin du Goumont, a path at the Memorial of Waterloo 1815

See also
 Hougoumont (disambiguation)
 Gomont (disambiguation)